This is a list of cosmonauts who have taken part in the missions of the Soviet space program and the Russian Federal Space Agency, including ethnic Russians and people of other ethnicities.

Soviet and Russian cosmonauts born outside Russia are marked with an asterisk and their place of birth is shown in an additional list.

For the full plain lists of Russian and Soviet cosmonauts in Wikipedia, see Category:Russian cosmonauts

Five female cosmonauts have flown on the Soviet/Russian program: Valentina Tereshkova, Svetlana Savitskaya, Yelena Kondakova, Yelena Serova and Anna Kikina.

Russian and Soviet cosmonauts

A
 Viktor Mikhaylovich Afanasyev —  Soyuz TM-11,  Soyuz TM-18, Soyuz TM-29, Soyuz TM-33/32
 Vladimir Aksyonov —  Soyuz 22, Soyuz T-2
 Aleksandr Pavlovich Aleksandrov —  Soyuz T-9, Soyuz TM-3
 Ivan Anikeyev (1933–1992) —  Expelled from Vostok program; no flights.
Oleg Artemyev* —  Soyuz TMA-12M, Soyuz MS-08, Soyuz MS-21
 Anatoly Artsebarsky* —  Soyuz TM-12
 Yuri Artyukhin (1930–1998) —  Soyuz 14
 Oleg Atkov —  Soyuz T-10/11
 Toktar Aubakirov* —  Soyuz TM-13/12
 Sergei Avdeyev —  Soyuz TM-15, Soyuz TM-22

B
 Aleksandr Balandin —  Soyuz TM-9
 Yuri Baturin —  Soyuz TM-28/27, Soyuz TM-32/31
 Pavel Belyayev (1925–1970) —  Voskhod 2
 Georgi Beregovoi* (1921–1995) —  Soyuz 3
 Anatoly Berezovoy (1942–2014) —  Soyuz T-5/7
 Valentin Bondarenko (1937–1961) —  No flights.
 Andrei Borisenko —  Soyuz TMA-21
 Nikolai Budarin —  STS-71/Soyuz TM-21, Soyuz TM-27, STS-113/Soyuz TMA-1
 Valery Bykovsky — (1934–2019) —  Vostok 5, Soyuz 22, Soyuz 31/29

D
 Vladimir Dezhurov —  Soyuz TM-21/STS-71
 Georgy Dobrovolsky* (1928–1971), Died on reentry. —  Soyuz 11
 Pyotr Dubrov —  Soyuz MS-18/Soyuz MS-19 (2021-22)
 Lev Dyomin (1926–1998) —  Soyuz 15
 Vladimir Dzhanibekov* —  Soyuz 27/26, Soyuz 39, Soyuz T-12, Soyuz T-13

F
 Andrey Fedyaev (1928–2022) —  SpaceX Crew-6
 Konstantin Feoktistov (1926–2009) —  Voskhod 1
 Valentin Filatyev (1930–1990) —  Expelled from Vostok program; no flights.
 Anatoly Filipchenko —  Soyuz 7, Soyuz 16

G
 Yuri Gagarin (1934–1968), First person in space. —  Vostok 1
 Yuri Gidzenko* —  Soyuz TM-22, Soyuz TM-31/STS-102, Soyuz TM-34/Soyuz TM-33
 Yuri Glazkov (1939–2008) —  Soyuz 24
 Viktor Gorbatko (1934–2017) —  Soyuz 7, Soyuz 24, Soyuz 37/36
 Georgi Grechko (1931–2017) —  Soyuz 17, Soyuz 26/27, Soyuz T-14/13
 Aleksei Gubarev (1931–2015) —  Soyuz 17, Soyuz 28

I
 Aleksandr Ivanchenkov —  Soyuz 29/31, Soyuz T-6,
 Anatoli Ivanishin —  Soyuz TMA-22, Soyuz MS-01, Soyuz MS-16,

K
 Aleksandr Kaleri* —  Soyuz TM-14, Soyuz TM-24, Soyuz TM-30, Soyuz TMA-3, Soyuz TMA-01M
 Yevgeny Khrunov (1933–2000) —  Soyuz 5/4
 Anna Kikina —  SpaceX Crew-5
 Leonid Kizim* (1941–2010) —  Soyuz T-3, Soyuz T-10/11, Soyuz T-15
 Pyotr Klimuk* —  Soyuz 13, Soyuz 18, Soyuz 30
 Vladimir Komarov (1927–1967), Died on reentry. —   Voskhod 1, Soyuz 1
 Yelena V. Kondakova —  Soyuz TM-20/STS-84
 Dmitri Kondratyev —  Soyuz TMA-20
 Oleg Kononenko* —  Soyuz TMA-12, Soyuz TMA-03M, Soyuz TMA-17M
 Mikhail Korniyenko —  Soyuz TMA-18, Soyuz TMA-16M
Sergey Korsakov* —  Soyuz MS-21
 Valery Korzun —  Soyuz TM-24, STS-111/113
 Oleg Kotov* —  Soyuz TMA-10, Soyuz TMA-17, Soyuz TMA-10M
 Vladimir Kovalyonok* —  Soyuz 25, Soyuz 29/31, Soyuz T-4
 Konstantin Kozeyev —  Soyuz TM-33/32
 Sergei Krikalev —   Soyuz TM-7, Soyuz TM-12/ Soyuz TM-13, STS-60, STS-88, Soyuz TM-31/STS-102, Soyuz TMA-6
 Valeri Kubasov (1935–2014) —  Soyuz 6, Soyuz 19, Soyuz 36/35
 Sergey Kud-Sverchkov —  Soyuz MS-16

L
 Aleksandr Laveykin —  Soyuz TM-2
 Vasili Lazarev (1928–1990) —  Soyuz 12, Soyuz 18a
 Aleksandr Lazutkin —  Soyuz TM-25
 Valentin Lebedev —  Soyuz 13, Soyuz T-5/7
 Alexei Leonov (1934–2019) —  Voskhod 2 (first walk in space), Soyuz 19
 Anatoli Levchenko* (1941–1988) —  Soyuz TM-4/3
 Yuri Lonchakov* —  STS-100, Soyuz TMA-1/TM-34, Soyuz TMA-13
 Vladimir Lyakhov* (1941–2018) —  Soyuz 32/34, Soyuz T-9, Soyuz TM-6/5

M
 Oleg Makarov (1933–2003) —  Soyuz 12, Soyuz 18a, Soyuz 27/26, Soyuz T-3
 Yuri Malenchenko* —  Soyuz TM-19, STS-106, Soyuz TMA-2, Soyuz TMA-11, Soyuz TMA-05M, Soyuz TMA-19M,
 Yury Malyshev (1941–1999) —  Soyuz T-2, Soyuz T-11/10
 Gennadi Manakov (1950–2019) —   Soyuz TM-10,  Soyuz TM-16
 Musa Manarov* —  Soyuz TM-4/6, Soyuz TM-11
Denis Matveev —  Soyuz MS-21
 Alexander Misurkin —  Soyuz TMA-08M, Soyuz MS-06, Soyuz MS-20
 Boris Morukov (1950–2015) —  STS-106
 Talgat Musabayev* —  Soyuz TM-19, Soyuz TM-27, Soyuz TM-32/31

N
 Grigori Nelyubov (1934–1966) —  Expelled from Vostok program, no flights.
 Andriyan Nikolayev (1929–2004) —  Vostok 3, Soyuz 9
 Oleg Novitski* —  Soyuz TMA-06M

O
 Yuri Onufrienko* —  Soyuz TM-23, STS-108/111
 Aleksey Ovchinin Soyuz TMA-20M

P

 Gennady Padalka —  Soyuz TM-28, Soyuz TMA-4, Soyuz TMA-14, Soyuz TMA-04M, Soyuz TMA-16M
 Viktor Patsayev* (1933–1971), Died on reentry. —  Soyuz 11
 Dmitry Petelin — Soyuz MS-22
 Aleksandr Poleshchuk —  Soyuz TM-16
 Valeri Polyakov (1942–2022) —  Soyuz TM-6/7,  Soyuz TM-18/20
 Leonid Popov* —  Soyuz 35/37, Soyuz 40, Soyuz T-7/5
 Pavel Popovich* (1930–2009) —  Vostok 4, Soyuz 14
 Sergey Prokopyev —  Soyuz MS-09, Soyuz MS-22

R
 Sergei Revin —  Soyuz TMA-04M
 Roman Romanenko —  Soyuz TMA-15, Soyuz TMA-07M
 Yuri Romanenko —  Soyuz 26/27, Soyuz 38, Soyuz TM-2/3
 Valery Rozhdestvensky (1939–2011) —  Soyuz 23
 Nikolai Rukavishnikov (1932–2002) —  Soyuz 10, Soyuz 16, Soyuz 33
 Sergei Ryazanski —  Soyuz TMA-10M
 Valery Ryumin (1939–2022) —  Soyuz 25, Soyuz 32/34, Soyuz 35/37,  STS-91
 Sergei Ryzhikov —  Soyuz MS-02, Soyuz MS-16

S

 Aleksandr Samokutyayev —  Soyuz TMA-21, Soyuz TMA-14M
 Gennadi Sarafanov (1942–2005) —  Soyuz 15
 Viktor Savinykh —  Soyuz T-4, Soyuz T-13/14, Soyuz TM-3,
 Svetlana Savitskaya —  Soyuz T-7/5, Soyuz T-12
 Aleksandr Serebrov (1944–2013) —  Soyuz T-7/5, Soyuz T-8, Soyuz TM-8,   Soyuz TM-17
 Yelena Serova —  Soyuz TMA-14M
 Vitali Sevastyanov (1935–2010) —  Soyuz 9, Soyuz 18
 Yuri Shargin —  Soyuz TMA-5/4
 Salizhan Sharipov* —  STS-89, Soyuz TMA-5
 Vladimir Shatalov* (1927–2021) —  Soyuz 4, Soyuz 8, Soyuz 10
 Klim Shipenko —  Soyuz MS-19
 Anton Shkaplerov —  Soyuz TMA-22, Soyuz TMA-15M
Georgi Shonin* (1935–1997) —  Soyuz 6
 Oleg Skripochka —  Soyuz TMA-01M
 Aleksandr Skvortsov —  Soyuz TMA-18
 Anatoly Solovyev*  —  Soyuz TM-5/4, Soyuz TM-9,  Soyuz TM-15, STS-71/Soyuz TM-21, Soyuz TM-26
 Vladimir Solovyov —  Soyuz T-10/11, Soyuz T-15
 Gennadi Strekalov (1940–2004) —  Soyuz T-3, Soyuz T-8, Soyuz T-11/10, Soyuz TM-10,  Soyuz TM-21/STS-71
 Maksim Surayev —  Soyuz TMA-16, Soyuz TMA-13M

T
 Yevgeni Tarelkin —  Soyuz TMA-06M
 Valentina Tereshkova, First woman in space. —  Vostok 6
 Gherman Titov (1935–2000) —  Vostok 2
 Vladimir Titov —  Soyuz T-8, Soyuz TM-4/6,  STS-63, STS-86
 Valeri Tokarev —  STS-96, Soyuz TMA-7
 Sergei Treshchov —  STS-111/113
 Vasili Tsibliyev* —  Soyuz TM-17, Soyuz TM-25
 Mikhail Tyurin —  STS-105/108, Soyuz TMA-9, Soyuz TMA-11M
 Mikhail Tyurin _  STS-105/108, Soyuz TMA-9, Soyuz TMA-11M

U
 Yuri Usachov —  Soyuz TM-18, Soyuz TM-23, STS-101, STS-102/STS-105

V
 Vladimir Vasyutin* (1952–2002) —  Soyuz T-14
 Ivan Vagner  Soyuz MS-16
 Aleksandr Viktorenko* —  Soyuz TM-3/2, Soyuz TM-8,  Soyuz TM-14, Soyuz TM-20
 Pavel Vinogradov —  Soyuz TM-26, Soyuz TMA-8
 Igor Volk* (1937–2017) —  Soyuz T-12

 Alexander Volkov* —  Soyuz T-14, Soyuz TM-7, Soyuz TM-13,  Soyuz TM-13
 Sergei Aleksandrovich Volkov* —  Soyuz TMA-12, Soyuz TMA-02M
 Vladislav Volkov (1935–1971), Died on reentry. —  Soyuz 7, Soyuz 11
 Boris Volynov —  Soyuz 5, Soyuz 21

 Sergei Vozovikov (1958–1993),drowned during survival training program —  No flights.

Y
 Boris Yegorov (1937–1994) —  Voskhod 1
 Aleksei Yeliseyev —  Soyuz 5/4, Soyuz 8, Soyuz 10
 Fyodor Yurchikhin* —  STS-112, Soyuz TMA-10, Soyuz TMA-19, Soyuz TMA-09M

Z
 Dmitri Zaikin (1932–2013) —  No flights.
 Sergei Zalyotin —  Soyuz TM-30, Soyuz TMA-1/TM-34
 Vitali Zholobov* —  Soyuz 21
 Vyacheslav Zudov —  Soyuz 23

Eastern Bloc cosmonauts
From 1978–1988, the Soviet Union transported 11 citizens of 10 nations closely allied to the USSR in the Soyuz crewed vehicle.  All of them flew as a result of the Interkosmos program. These space travelers have usually been referred to as "cosmonauts".

  Afghanistan: Abdul Ahad Mohmand — Soyuz TM-6/5
  Bulgaria:
 Aleksandar Panayotov Aleksandrov — Soyuz TM-5/4
 Georgi Ivanov — Soyuz 33
  Cuba: Arnaldo Tamayo Méndez — Soyuz 38
  Czechoslovakia: Vladimír Remek — Soyuz 28
  East Germany: Sigmund Jähn — Soyuz 31/29
  Hungary: Bertalan Farkas — Soyuz 36/35
  Mongolia: Jügderdemidiin Gürragchaa — Soyuz 39
  Poland: Mirosław Hermaszewski — Soyuz 30
  Romania: Dumitru Prunariu — Soyuz 40
  Vietnam: Phạm Tuân — Soyuz 37/36

Other cosmonauts
In 1982, as an extension of the Intercosmos program, the Soviet Union began to fly the citizens of countries not part of the Soviet bloc, starting with Jean-Loup Chrétien of France.  The USSR and later Russia have transported 49 citizens of 18 other nations on the Soyuz vehicle, usually as part of a commercial arrangement, including seven space tourists flying through the Space Adventures contract. Since 2001, the Soyuz has been used to transport ESA, JAXA, and NASA astronauts to the International Space Station.  These space travelers are not always referred to as "cosmonauts", especially if they belong to another space program; e.g., NASA employees are almost always referred to as "astronauts", even if they are flying on a Russian vehicle.

Africa
  South Africa: Mark Shuttleworth (Space Adventures) — Soyuz TM-34/33

Americas
  Brazil: Marcos Pontes — Soyuz TMA-8
  Canada:
 Guy Laliberté (Space Adventures) — Soyuz TMA-16/14
 Chris Hadfield — Soyuz TMA-07M
 Robert Thirsk — Soyuz TMA-15
  United States:
 Joseph M. Acaba — Soyuz TMA-04M
 Anousheh Ansari* (Space Adventures) — Soyuz TMA-9/8
 Michael R. Barratt — Soyuz TMA-14
 Ken Bowersox — Soyuz TMA-1 (landing only)
 Daniel C. Burbank — Soyuz TMA-22
 Leroy Chiao — Soyuz TMA-5
 Timothy Creamer — Soyuz TMA-17
 Tracy Caldwell Dyson — Soyuz TMA-18
 Catherine Coleman — Soyuz TMA-20
 Michael Fincke — Soyuz TMA-4, Soyuz TMA-13
 Michael Foale* — Soyuz TMA-3
 Kevin A. Ford — Soyuz TMA-06M
 Michael E. Fossum — Soyuz TMA-02M
 Ronald J. Garan, Jr. — Soyuz TMA-21
 Richard Garriott* (Space Adventures) — Soyuz TMA-13/12
 Michael S. Hopkins — Soyuz TMA-10M
 Scott Kelly — Soyuz TMA-01M, Soyuz TMA-16M
 Kjell N. Lindgren — Soyuz TMA-17M
 Michael Lopez-Alegria* — Soyuz TMA-9
 Ed Lu — Soyuz TMA-2
 Thomas Marshburn — Soyuz TMA-07M
 Richard Mastracchio — Soyuz TMA-11M
 William S. McArthur — Soyuz TMA-7
 Karen Nyberg — Soyuz TMA-09M
 Gregory Olsen (Space Adventures) — Soyuz TMA-7/6
 Donald Pettit — Soyuz TMA-1 (landing only), Soyuz TMA-03M
 John L. Phillips — Soyuz TMA-6
 William Shepherd — Soyuz TM-31 (launch only)
 Charles Simonyi* (Space Adventures) — Soyuz TMA-10/9, Soyuz TMA-14/13
 Norman Thagard — Soyuz TM-21 (launch only)
 Dennis Tito (Space Adventures) — Soyuz TM-32/31
 Terry W. Virts — Soyuz TMA-15M
 Shannon Walker — Soyuz TMA-19
 Douglas H. Wheelock — Soyuz TMA-19
 Peggy Whitson — Soyuz TMA-11
 Jeffrey Williams — Soyuz TMA-8, Soyuz TMA-16
 Sunita Williams — Soyuz TMA-05M
 Barry E. Wilmore — Soyuz TMA-14M
 Gregory R. Wiseman — Soyuz TMA-13M

Asia
  India: Rakesh Sharma (Intercosmos) — Soyuz T-11/10
  Japan:
 Toyohiro Akiyama — Soyuz TM-11/10
 Akihiko Hoshide — Soyuz TMA-05M
 Soichi Noguchi — Soyuz TMA-17
 Satoshi Furukawa — Soyuz TMA-02M
 Koichi Wakata — Soyuz TMA-11M
 Kimiya Yui — Soyuz TMA-17M
  Malaysia: Sheikh Muszaphar Shukor — Soyuz TMA-11/10
  South Korea: Yi So-yeon —  Soyuz TMA-12/11
  Syria: Muhammed Faris (Intercosmos) — Soyuz TM-3/2...

Europe
  Austria: Franz Viehböck — Soyuz TM-13/12
  Belgium: Frank De Winne, EAC — Soyuz TMA-1/TM-34, Soyuz TMA-15
  France:
 Jean-Loup Chrétien, CNES (Intercosmos) — Soyuz T-6, Soyuz TM-7/6
 Léopold Eyharts, EAC — Soyuz TM-27/26
 Claudie André-Deshays Haigneré, EAC — Soyuz TM-24/23,  Soyuz TM-33/32
 Jean-Pierre Haigneré, EAC — Soyuz TM-17/16, Soyuz TM-29
 Michel Tognini, EAC — Soyuz TM-15/14
  Germany:
 Reinhold Ewald, EAC — Soyuz TM-25/24
 Klaus-Dietrich Flade — Soyuz TM-14/13
 Alexander Gerst — Soyuz TMA-13M
 Ulf Merbold, EAC — Soyuz TM-20/19
 Thomas Reiter, EAC — Soyuz TM-22
  Italy:
 Samantha Cristoforetti, EAC — Soyuz TMA-15M
 Roberto Vittori, EAC — Soyuz TM-34/33, Soyuz TMA-6/5
 Paolo Nespoli, EAC — Soyuz TMA-20
 Luca Parmitano, EAC — Soyuz TMA-09M
  The Netherlands: André Kuipers, EAC — Soyuz TMA-4/3, Soyuz TMA-03M
  Slovakia: Ivan Bella — Soyuz TM-29/28
  Spain: Pedro Duque, EAC — Soyuz TMA-3/2
  United Kingdom: Helen Sharman — Soyuz TM-12/11
 Timothy Peake, EAC — Soyuz TMA-19M

Soviet and Russian cosmonauts born outside Russia
All Soviet and RKA cosmonauts have been born within the borders of the U.S.S.R.; no cosmonaut who was born in independent Russia has yet flown. Many cosmonauts, however, were born in Soviet territories outside the boundaries of Russia, and may be claimed by various Soviet successor states as nationals of those states.  All claimed Soviet or Russian citizenship at the time of their space flights.

Azerbaidzhan S.S.R. / Azerbaijan  

 Musa Manarov, born in Baku, Azerbaijan

Byelorussian S.S.R. / Belarus 

 Pyotr Klimuk, born in Komarovka, Belarus 
 Vladimir Kovalyonok, born in Beloye, Belarus 
 Oleg Novitski, born in Chervyen', Belarus

Georgian S.S.R. / Georgia  

 Fyodor Yurchikhin, born in Batumi, Georgia

Kazakh S.S.R. / Kazakhstan  

 Toktar Aubakirov, born in Karaganda, Kazakhstan 
 Yuri Lonchakov, born in Balkhash, Kazakhstan 
 Talgat Musabayev, born in Kargaly, Kazakhstan 
 Viktor Patsayev, born in Aktyubinsk, Kazakhstan 
Dmitry Petelin — born in Kustanai, Kazakhstan
 Vladimir Shatalov, born in Petropavlovsk, Kazakhstan 
 Aleksandr Viktorenko, born in Olginka, Kazakhstan

Kirghiz S.S.R. / Kyrgyzstan  

 Salizhan Sharipov, born in Uzgen, Kyrgyzstan 
Sergey Korsakov, born in Krunze, Kyrgyzstan

Latvian S.S.R. / Latvia 

 Aleksandr Kaleri, born in Jūrmala, Latvia 
 Anatoly Solovyev, born in Riga, Latvia  
 Oleg Artemyev, born in Riga, Latvia

Turkmen S.S.R. / Turkmenistan 

 Oleg Kononenko, born in Chardzhou, Turkmenistan

Ukrainian S.S.R. / Ukraine 

 Anatoly Artsebarsky, born in Prosyana, Ukraine 
 Georgi Beregovoi, born in Federivka, Ukraine 
 Georgiy Dobrovolskiy, born in Odessa, Ukraine 
 Yuri Gidzenko, born in Yelanets, Ukraine 
 Leonid Kizim, born in Krasnyi Lyman, Ukraine 
 Oleg Kotov, born in Simferopol, Ukraine 
 Anatoli Levchenko, born in Krasnokutsk, Ukraine 
 Vladimir Lyakhov, born in Antratsyt, Ukraine 
 Yuri Malenchenko, born in Svitlovodsk, Ukraine 
 Yuri Onufriyenko, born in Ryasne, Ukraine 
 Leonid Popov, born in Oleksandriia, Ukraine 
 Pavel Popovich, born in Uzyn, Ukraine. 
 Georgi Shonin, born in Rovenky, Ukraine 
 Vasili Tsibliyev, born in Horikhivka, Ukraine 
 Vladimir Vasyutin, born in Kharkiv, Ukraine 
 Igor Volk, born in Zmiiv, Ukraine 
 Aleksandr Volkov, born in Horlivka, Ukraine  
 Sergei Aleksandrovich Volkov, born in Chuhuiv, Ukraine 
 Vitali Zholobov, born in Zburyivka, Ukraine

Uzbek S.S.R. / Uzbekistan 

 Vladimir Dzhanibekov, born in Iskandar, Uzbekistan

See also
 List of Russian aviators
 List of Russian explorers
 List of Russian inventors
 List of Soviet human spaceflight missions
 List of Russian human spaceflight missions

References

Cosmonauts
Cosmonauts, Russian